

Erich Carl Kissing is a German painter known for his themes in combination with his high-precision glazing technique. He has a twin sister and a brother six years his senior. Their father worked as a plumber and in other crafts and their mother was a housewife. Kissing lives and works in the house his parents built in Leipzig in 1935.

Erich Kissing's took private drawing classes to enhance his abilities. After training to professionally retouch offset-prints he turned to study art in his hometown Leipzig from 1965 till 1970. During his studies at Hochschule für Grafik und Buchkunst under the hands of his teachers Hans Mayer-Foreyt and Werner Tübke he became a painter (Feinmalerei). His modern art is part of the Realist Leipzig School. 

The characteristic style of his paintings results from his high-precision glazing technique which consists of several layers to completing a painting he works on it for months on end. His themes are romantic and mystical sometimes bizarre but his style remains invariantly realistic. One of his memorable motifs is the recurring hedonistic centaur.

Among his works, "Sommertag" picture link (2007–09) is notable for its large format and its reference to Diego Velázquez "The Triumph of Bacchus"  ("Los Borrachos", 1628–29).

References

External links
 exhibition at Panorama Museum Bad Frankenhausen, Germany

1943 births
Living people
20th-century German painters
20th-century German male artists
German male painters
21st-century German painters
21st-century German male artists
German contemporary artists
Artists from Leipzig